Khetrānī, or Khetranki, is an Indo-Aryan language of north-eastern Balochistan. It is spoken by the majority of the Khetrans, a Baloch tribe that occupies a hilly tract in the Sulaiman Mountains comprising the whole of Barkhan District as well as small parts of neighbouring Kohlu District to the south-west, and Musakhel District to the north. The ethnic Khetran population found to the east in the Vehova Tehsil of Taunsa Sharif District of Punjab instead speak Saraiki. Alternative names for the language attested at the start of the 20th century are Barāzai and Jāfaraki.

Khetrani has grammatical features in common with both Saraiki and with Sindhi, but is not mutually intelligible with either. Khetrani has a relatively small number of Balochi loanwords in its vocabulary.  Khetrani was formerly a dialect continuum of both Sindhi and Saraiki.

It is likely to have been formerly spoken over a wider area, which has been reduced with the expansion of Pashto from the north and Balochi from the south-east. The earlier suggestion that Khetrani might be a remnant of a Dardic language has been found "difficult to substantiate" by more detailed recent research.


History

Footnotes

Bibliography

External links

 Worldview of Khetran

Languages of Balochistan, Pakistan
Northwestern Indo-Aryan languages